Christophe Durand (born 5 April 1973 in Décines-Charpieu) is a French table tennis player.

He won his first Paralympic medal, a gold, at the 2000 Summer Paralympic Games. At the 2004 Games, he won a bronze in the individual event, and another in the team event. He represented France again at the 2008 Summer Paralympics, in class 4/5, and won gold by defeating South Korea's Jung Eun-Chang in five sets.

References

External links 
 

1973 births
Living people
People from Décines-Charpieu
French male table tennis players
Table tennis players at the 1996 Summer Paralympics
Table tennis players at the 2000 Summer Paralympics
Table tennis players at the 2004 Summer Paralympics
Table tennis players at the 2008 Summer Paralympics
Paralympic table tennis players of France
Medalists at the 1996 Summer Paralympics
Medalists at the 2000 Summer Paralympics
Medalists at the 2004 Summer Paralympics
Medalists at the 2008 Summer Paralympics
Paralympic medalists in table tennis
Paralympic gold medalists for France
Paralympic silver medalists for France
Paralympic bronze medalists for France
Sportspeople from Lyon Metropolis
20th-century French people
21st-century French people